Francesca Piccinini (born 10 January 1979 in Massa) is an Italian volleyball player who has represented Italy four times (2000, 2004, 2008 and 2012) at the Summer Olympics. She was a member of the Women's National Team that won the gold medal at the 2002 World Championship in Germany. She made her debut for Italy on 10 June 1995 against the United States. She was inspired to become a professional volleyball player by the Japanese anime Attack No. 1, shown in Italy in the 1980s under the title Mimì e la nazionale della pallavolo.

In 2004, she appeared nude in a calendar published by the Italian magazine Men's Health and modeled for Liu·Jo.

Playing professionally with the Italian club Volley Bergamo, she won the "Most Valuable Player" award when her team won the 2009–10 CEV Indesit Champions League title.

Piccinini played with her national team at the 2014 World Championship. There her team ended up in fourth place after losing  the bronze medal match 2–3 to Brazil.

In 2016, she  again became "Most Valuable Player" when her team, Pomì Casalmaggiore, claimed the 2015–16 CEV DenizBank Champions League title 3–0 over the Turkish VakıfBank Istanbul.

Clubs
  Robur Massa (1991–1993)
  Pallavolo Carrarese (1993–1995)
  Reggio Emilia (1995–1996)
  Volley Modena (1996–1997)
  Volley 2000 Spezzano (1997–1998)
  Rexona Volley (1998–1999)
  Volley Bergamo (1999–2012)
  Chieri Volley (2012–2013)
  LJ Volley (2013–2015)
  Pomì Casalmaggiore (2015–2016)
  Igor Gorgonzola Novara (2016–2019)
  Futura Volley Busto Arsizio (2020–present)

Awards

Individuals 
2004 FIVB World Grand Prix "Fair Play Award"
2006–07 CEV Champions League "Best Spiker"
2009–10 CEV Indesit Champions League Final Four "Most Valuable Player"
2015–16 CEV DenizBank Champions League Final Four "Most Valuable Player"

Clubs
 1999 Italian Supercup -  Champions, with Volley Bergamo
 1999–00 Women's CEV Champions League —  Champions, with Volley Bergamo
 2000–01 Italian Championship -  Runner-Up, with Volley Bergamo
 2001 Italian Supercup —  Runner-Up, with Volley Bergamo
 2001 Italian Cup —  Runner-Up, with Volley Bergamo
 2001–02 Women's CEV Champions League —  Runner-Up, with Volley Bergamo
 2001–02 Italian Championship -  Champion, with Volley Bergamo
 2002 Italian Supercup —  Runner-Up, with Volley Bergamo
 2002 Italian Cup —  Runner-Up, with Volley Bergamo
 2002–03 Women's CEV Champions League —  Bronze medal, with Volley Bergamo
 2003–04 CEV Challenge Cup -  Champions, with Volley Bergamo
 2003–04 Italian Championship -  Champion, with Volley Bergamo
 2004 Italian Supercup -  Champions, with Volley Bergamo
 2004 Italian Cup —  Runner-Up, with Volley Bergamo
 2004–05 Women's CEV Champions League —  Champions, with Volley Bergamo
 2004–05 Italian Championship -  Runner-Up, with Volley Bergamo
 2005 Italian Supercup —  Runner-Up, with Volley Bergamo
 2005 Italian Cup —  Runner-Up, with Volley Bergamo
 2005–06 Women's CEV Champions League —  Bronze medal, with Volley Bergamo
 2005–06 Italian Championship -  Champion, with Volley Bergamo
 2006 Italian Cup —  Champions, with Volley Bergamo
 2006–07 CEV Champions League —  Champions, with Volley Bergamo
 2008 Italian Supercup —  Runner-Up, with Volley Bergamo
 2008 Italian Cup —  Champions, with Volley Bergamo
 2008–09 CEV Champions League —  Champions, with Volley Bergamo
 2009–10 CEV Champions League —  Champions, with Volley Bergamo
 2010 Italian Cup —  Runner-Up, with Volley Bergamo
 2010 FIVB Club World Championship —  Bronze medal, with Volley Bergamo
 2010–11 Italian Championship -  Champion, with Volley Bergamo
 2011 Italian Supercup -  Champions, with Volley Bergamo
 2011 Italian Cup —  Runner-Up, with Volley Bergamo
 2015 Italian Cup —  Runner-Up, with LJ Volley
 2015–16 CEV Champions League —  Champions, with Pomì Casalmaggiore
 2018–19 CEV Champions League —  Champions, with Igor Gorgonzola Novara
 2019 Italian Cup —  Champions, with Igor Gorgonzola Novara
 2020 Italian Cup —  Runner-Up, with Futura Volley Busto Arsizio

References

External links

 

1979 births
Living people
People from Massa
Italian women's volleyball players
Serie A1 (women's volleyball) players
Olympic volleyball players of Italy
Olympic gold medalists for Italy
Volleyball players at the 2000 Summer Olympics
Volleyball players at the 2004 Summer Olympics
Volleyball players at the 2008 Summer Olympics
Volleyball players at the 2012 Summer Olympics
Mediterranean Games medalists in volleyball
Mediterranean Games gold medalists for Italy
Competitors at the 2009 Mediterranean Games
Sportspeople from the Province of Massa-Carrara